The Jewish-American patronage of Chinese restaurants became prominent in the 20th century, especially among Jewish New Yorkers. It has received attention as a paradoxical form of assimilation by embracing an unfamiliar cuisine that eased the consumption of non-kosher foods.

Factors include the relative absence of dairy products compared to European cuisines, concern over German and Italian antisemitic regimes in the 1930s and the proximity of Jewish and Chinese immigrants to each other in New York City.

The American Jewish habit of eating at Chinese restaurants on Christmas is a common stereotype portrayed in film and television, but has a factual basis as the tradition may have arisen from the lack of other open restaurants on Christmas Day.

Historical background
The relationship Jewish people have with Chinese restaurants during Christmas is well documented. The definitive scholarly and popular treatment of this subject appears in the book A Kosher Christmas: 'Tis the Season to Be Jewish by Rabbi Joshua Eli Plaut, Ph.D. in the third chapter entitled "We Eat Chinese Food on Christmas." 

The origin of Jews eating Chinese food dates to the end of the 19th century on the Lower East Side, Manhattan, because Jews and the Chinese lived close together. 

There were nearly a million Eastern European Jews living in New York in 1910 and Jews constituted over "one quarter of the city’s population." The majority of the Chinese immigrated to the Lower East Side from California after the 1880s and many of them went into the restaurant business.

The first mention of the Jewish population eating Chinese food was in 1899 in The American Hebrew journal. They criticized Jews for eating at non-kosher restaurants, particularly singling out Chinese food. Jews continued to eat at these establishments. 

In 1936, it was reported that there were 18 Chinese restaurants open in heavily populated Jewish areas in the Lower East Side. Jews felt more comfortable at these restaurants than they did at the Italian or German eateries that were prevalent during this time period. 

Joshua Plaut wrote of the origin of Jews eating Chinese food on Christmas: "It dates at least as early as 1935 when The New York Times reported a certain restaurant owner named Eng Shee Chuck who brought chow mein on Christmas Day to the Jewish Children’s Home in Newark. 

"Over the years, Jewish families and friends gather on Christmas Eve and Christmas Day at Chinese restaurants across the United States to socialize and to banter, to reinforce social and familiar bonds, and to engage in a favorite activity for Jews during the Christmas holiday. The Chinese restaurant has become a place where Jewish identity is made, remade and announced."

Reasons for appeal of Chinese food for Jews
In Lower Manhattan, immigrant Jews would open delis for other Jews, Italians ran restaurants primarily for other Italians, and Germans had many places that would serve only Germans, but Chinese restaurant owners "accept[ed] Jews and other immigrant and ethnic groups as customers without precondition." More of the Jews and Italians would want to eat at Chinese restaurants than they would want to eat at their own ethnic restaurants. 

Chinese restaurateurs' lack of anti-Semitism gave Jews a sense of security, and they were also drawn to the restaurants' exoticism. "Of all the peoples whom immigrant Jews and their children met, of all the foods they encountered in America, the Chinese were the most foreign, the most 'un-Jewish'." 

A large majority of the Jews saw "eating in Chinese restaurants as an antidote for Jewish parochialism, for the exclusive and overweening emphasis on the culture of the Jews as it had been." 

Many of the people whom Tuchman and Levine spoke to felt that eating in a place that was "un-Jewish" showed that they could be "somewhat sophisticated, urbane New Yorkers." The restaurants had unusual wallpaper, eccentric decorations, chopsticks, and exotic food names. 

The generations of Jews who grew up in New York after the initial Eastern European Jews immigrated wanted their identity to be based on cosmopolitan ideals.

Chinese food and kosher law
Chinese food allowed Jews to transition from strict kosher to incorporating non-kosher foods into their diets. Chinese cuisine is "unusually well suited to Jewish tastes because, unlike virtually any other cuisine available in America, traditional Chinese cooking rarely uses milk products." Because kosher food cannot mix meat with dairy, generally Jews can order meat dishes in a Chinese restaurant without worrying that they will contain dairy products such as cheese, unlike in other cuisines, such as Italian, which routinely serve meat mixed with cheese.

While most first-generation Jews living in America strictly practiced kashrut at all times, many second-generation Jews remained strict in their home observance but became more flexible in the foods they ate outside the home. 

The nature of Chinese food allowed them to rationalize this decision, as it is "disguised through a process of cutting, chopping and mincing. Pork, shrimp, lobster, and other so-called dietary abominations are no longer viewed in their more natural states."

This process of cutting, chopping, and mincing, referred to as ko p'eng (to cut and cook) in ancient Chinese texts, made the ingredients invisible and thus safe treyf. For instance, pork was hidden and wrapped in wontons that looked similar to Jewish kreplach (dumplings). 

Ultimately this gave way to many US-born Jews rejecting kashrut altogether as "impractical and anachronistic". Breaking the rules of kashrut by eating Chinese food allowed the younger generation to assert their independence and further established a "cosmopolitan spirit".

Among Orthodox-Jewish communities in America, Chinese restaurants which fully follow kashrut laws do exist, and are under strict rabbinical supervision.

Cultural significance
The relationship that Jews have with Chinese food runs deeper than stereotype. "Eating Chinese [food] has become a meaningful symbol of American Judaism… For in eating Chinese, the Jews found a modern means of expressing their traditional cultural values. The savoring of Chinese food is now a ritualized celebration of immigration, education, family, community, and continuity." Chinese food is considered a staple in the Jewish culture, and the further option of kosher Chinese food is also becoming more available in the US.

Michael Tong of Shun Lee Palace talked about the issue in a 2003 interview with The New York Times:Welcome to the conundrum that is Christmas New York style: while most restaurants close for the holiday, or in a few cases, stay open and serve a prix fixe meal laden with froufrou, thousands of diners, most of them Jewish, are faced with a dilemma. There's nothing to celebrate at home and no place to eat out, at least if they want a regular dinner. That leaves Chinese restaurants...

See also

 American Chinese cuisine
 Jews and Christmas
 Nittel Nacht, Jewish observance on Christmas Eve

References

Further reading
 

American Chinese cuisine
Jewish American culture
Jewish cuisine
Food and drink appreciation
Christmas in the United States
Culture of New York City